Udvardya is a genus of jumping spider endemic to New Guinea. , it contains only one species, Udvardya elegans.

Males and females are similar in appearance. There are minor differences in the abdominal pattern, and males have small curved "horns" on their chelicerae. In both sexes, the first pair of legs are greatly enlarged.

Behavior
Nothing is known about the biology of this species, as it is only known from dead specimens.

Name
The genus name is derived from the Hungarian biologist Miklos Udvardy; elegans is Latin for "elegant".

References

Further reading
  (1915): Attides nouveaux appartenant aux collections du Musee national hongrois. Ann. hist.-nat. Mus. nat. Hung. 13: 478.
  (2007): The world spider catalog, version 8.0. American Museum of Natural History.

External links

 Diagnostic Drawings Library: Udvardya elegans (photographs and drawings)

Salticidae
Monotypic Salticidae genera
Spiders of Asia
Arthropods of New Guinea
Endemic fauna of New Guinea